KLTI (1560 AM, "True Country 1560") is a radio station licensed to serve Macon, Missouri, United States.  The station is owned by Best Broadcast Group and the broadcast license is held by Chirillo Electronics.

KLTI broadcasts a country music format. Past formats have included Urban Oldies, Rhythmic Oldies, All 70s, Hot AC and Classic Country.

The station was assigned the KLTI call letters by the Federal Communications Commission.

History of call letters
The call letters KLTI were previously assigned to an AM station in Longview, Texas. It began broadcasting October 27, 1948, on 1280 kHz with 1 KW power (daytime). The station was owned by R.G. LeTourneau, who also owned sister station KLTI-FM.

References

External links

LTI
Classic country radio stations in the United States